Adékọyà is a family name of Yoruba origin meaning "the crown or royalty rejects oppression or suffering". Notable people with the name include:

 Jubril Adekoya (born 1994), American college basketball player and member of the 2013–14 Valparaiso Crusaders men's basketball team
 Kemi Adekoya (born 1993), Nigerian-Bahraini track hurdler
 Oladipupo Adekoya Campbell (1919–2006), Nigerian musician and bandleader
 Yewande Adekoya (born 1984), Nigerian film actress, filmmaker, director and producer
 Adebowale O. Adekoya(born 1969), Professor of Medicine, consultant physician and nephrologist.  
 Bola J Adekoya. (born 1973).Professor of Ophthalmology, consultant Ophthalmologist of international repute.

References 

Yoruba-language surnames